Charles Walter Brook (2 February 1901 — 16 July 1976) was an Argentine first-class cricketer.

Brook was born in Argentina in February 1901. Brook played first-class cricket for Argentina as a wicket-keeper in January 1927, making two appearances against the touring Marylebone Cricket Club at Buenos Aires. He scored 10 runs in these two matches, with a highest score of 7. In his capacity as wicket-keeper, he took 5 catches. Brook died in Argentina in July 1976.

References

External links

1901 births
1976 deaths
Argentine people of English descent
Argentine cricketers